Skaf or SKAF may refer to:

People
 Bilal Skaf (born 1981), Australian serial gang rapist
 May Skaf (1969–2018), Syrian actress and activist
 Paulo Skaf (born 1955), Brazilian entrepreneur and politician

Other uses
 SKAF Khemis Miliana, Algerian football club
 Republic of Korea Air Force, also known as South Korean Air Force (SKAF)

See also
Skaff (disambiguation)